Kamona is a rural locality in the local government area (LGA) of Dorset in the North-east LGA region of Tasmania. The 2016 census recorded a population of 11 for the state suburb of Kamona.

History 
Kamona was gazetted as a locality in 1969. The name “Kamona Moina” was given to a parish in the district in 1880. It is believed that “Kamona” is part of the Aboriginal words for “venom”. 

The locality has been used for mining and timber production.

Geography
The Arnon River forms most of the western boundary.

Road infrastructure 
Route A3 (Tasman Highway) passes to the south, and Kamona Valley Road provides access to the locality. Route C834 (Forester Road) passes to the north, and Arnon Road also accesses the locality.

References

North East Tasmania
Localities of Dorset Council (Australia)